On November 2, 1976, the District of Columbia held an election for its non-voting House delegate representing the District of Columbia's at-large congressional district. The winner of the race was Walter E. Fauntroy (D), who won his third re-election.  The election was notable for having a record-low turnout, as less than 16,000 voters cast their ballot in this election.  This was the lowest recorded turnout for an election to this office.  All elected members would serve in 95th United States Congress.

The delegate is elected for two-year terms, as are all other representatives and delegates minus the Resident Commissioner of Puerto Rico, who is elected to a four-year term.

Candidates 
Walter E. Fauntroy, a Democrat, sought re-election for his fourth term to the United States House of Representatives. Fauntroy was opposed in this election by Republican challenger Daniel L. Hall and Statehood Party candidate Louis S. Aronica who received 9.95% and 6.84%, respectively.  This resulted in Fauntroy being elected with 77.18% of the vote.

Results

See also
 United States House of Representatives elections in the District of Columbia

References 

United States House
District of Columbia
1976